Michael Joseph Wise (born March 21, 1985) is a Canadian music producer, songwriter. He is based in Toronto, Ontario. In 2020, he was nominated for the Jack Richardson Producer of the Year Award and nominated for a Juno Award for co-writing Bülow's “Sweet Little Lies”.

Discography

Singles

Full discography

Notes

References

Canadian record producers
Canadian male songwriters
Living people
People from Toronto
1986 births